Possum Trot is an unincorporated community in Highland County, Virginia, United States. Possum Trot is cradled by the long ridge line of Monterey Mountain to the west and Ginseng Mountain to the north.

References

Unincorporated communities in Highland County, Virginia
Unincorporated communities in Virginia